Dany Boivin is a Canadian art director and production designer. He is most noted for his work on the film The Twentieth Century, for which he won both the Canadian Screen Award for Best Art Direction/Production Design at the 8th Canadian Screen Awards and the Prix Iris for Best Art Direction at the 22nd Quebec Cinema Awards.

His prior credits included the films Bydlo and The Tesla World Light.

References

External links

21st-century Canadian artists
Canadian production designers
Best Art Direction/Production Design Genie and Canadian Screen Award winners
Artists from Quebec
French Quebecers
Living people
Year of birth missing (living people)